Dispatched RND transporter family member 3 is a protein that in humans is encoded by the DISP3 gene.

References

Further reading